Trebižani is a small village in the Municipality of Komen in the Littoral region of Slovenia.

References

External links

Trebižani on Geopedia

Populated places in the Municipality of Komen